Afroedura broadleyi, also known commonly as Broadley's rock gecko, is a species of lizard in the family Gekkonidae. The species is endemic to South Africa.

Etymology
The specific name, broadleyi, is in honor of African herpetologist Donald George Broadley.

Geographic range
A. broadleyi was first found in Limpopo province, South Africa.

References

broadleyi
Endemic reptiles of South Africa
Reptiles described in 2014